Kati Tolmoff  (born 3 December 1983 in Tartu) is a badminton player from Estonia. She represented Estonia at the 2008 and 2016 Olympic Games. She competed in the women's singles event, where she lost to Chloe Magee 21–18, 18–21, and 19–21 in the first round. In 2016, she was the runner-up in the group K stage, lose a match to Ratchanok Intanon, and won a match to Yip Pui Yin. In September 2009, Tolmoff announced that because of a lack of money, her professional career was over. But she returned in 2014. Tolmoff also competed at the 2015 Baku European Games.

Awards
 Estonian National Badminton Championships, women's singles, 12 times
 Estonian National Badminton Championships, women's doubles, 6 times
 Estonian National Badminton Championships, mixed doubles, 6 times

Achievements

BWF International Challenge/Series
Women's singles

Women's doubles

Mixed doubles

 BWF International Challenge tournament
 BWF International Series tournament
 BWF Future Series tournament

References

External links
 
 
  at baku2015.com

1983 births
Living people
Sportspeople from Tartu
Estonian female badminton players
Badminton players at the 2008 Summer Olympics
Badminton players at the 2016 Summer Olympics
Olympic badminton players of Estonia
Badminton players at the 2015 European Games
European Games competitors for Estonia